Golden Light (Finnish: Kultainen kynttilänjalka) is a 1946 Finnish crime film directed by Edvin Laine and starring Laine, Mirjam Novero, Rauha Puntti.

Partial cast
 Edvin Laine as Markus Mäntylä  
 Mirjam Novero as Asta Kataja  
 Rauha Puntti as Ulla Karpela  
 Esko Saha as Lauri Takala 
 Jalmari Rinne as Kataja  
 Hilja Jorma as Hilda Kataja  
 Matti Aulos as Takala  
 Emma Väänänen as Mrs. Takala  
 Kaarlo Saarnio as Silmäpuoli-Mäntylä 
 Mirjami Kuosmanen as Erna  
 Enni Rekola as Fanny  
 Paavo Jännes as Karpela  
 Verna Piponius as Stiina  
 Laina Laine as Adele  
 Anni Hämäläinen as Hedvig  
 Artturi Laakso as Helmer

External links 
 

1946 films
1946 crime films
Finnish crime films
1940s Finnish-language films
Films directed by Edvin Laine
French black-and-white films